James Stewart, Commendator of Kelso and Melrose (c. 1529–1557) was a member of the Scottish royal family.

James Stewart was a son of James V of Scotland and Elizabeth Shaw, a member of the Schaw of Sauchie family. His exact birthdate is unknown. A document dated 1534 states he was in his fifth year.

Elizabeth Schaw is sometimes identified as a woman of the same name who married a minor courtier of James V, Robert Gibb.

James V had children with a number of mistresses before his marriages to Madeleine of France and Mary of Guise. A more well-known half-brother, James Stewart, 1st Earl of Moray, was variously known as "Lord James", the Prior of St Andrews, the Earl of Mar, the Earl of Moray, and Regent Moray. 

In April 1532 the king's wardrobe servant and pursemaster Harry Kemp spent £20 Scots on the expenses of keeping the infant and his nurse's wages.

Like other members of the Scottish royal family, James Stewart was granted an income from monastic lands, as Commendator of Kelso and Melrose. James V wrote to the Pope Clement VII to obtain dispensations so his sons could hold clerical offices. In 1541 James V wrote to Cardinal Ghinucci in Rome to obtain permission to restructure the landholding system of the estates of Kelso and Melrose. He intended to realise a financial advantage (in the name of his son) by setting tenancies in "feufarm" with long lease "teinds" or tithes. In order to do this, permission was required from Rome for the actions of administrators on the behalf of the nine-year old James Stewart.

James Stewart was at Stirling Castle with his sister Mary, Queen of Scots on 28 July 1544, and signed and sealed a charter.

He wrote a letter to his step-mother Mary of Guise from Melrose, apparently in 1545, discussing the business of feuing and teinds on her jointure lands of Selkirk and Ettrick. He had been recently been with her at Linlithgow Palace. As instructed, he told Tom Scot of Haining to take his teind crops to their barn yard in Selkirk.

In August 1548 his half brothers John Stewart, Commendator of Coldingham and Lord Robert sailed for France from Dumbarton with Mary, Queen of Scots. According to an English observer, Henry Johnes, the older brothers, Lord James, Prior of St Andrews and James Stewart, Commendator of Kelso and Melrose refused to go with her.

In 1550, after the conclusion of the war known the Rough Wooing, he accompanied Mary of Guise on a visit to French court and his half-sister Mary, Queen of Scots. His half-brother John Stewart, Commendator of Coldingham also came. A number of Scottish nobles and lairds were included on the trip, perhaps a move intended to build support for pro-French policy.

He died in 1557.

In March 2021 one of his seal matrices, as Commendator of Kelso of Melrose, showing his royal arms with a "bar sinister" of illegitimacy, was acquired by the National Museum of Scotland.

References

1557 deaths
Court of James V of Scotland
16th-century Scottish people
James
Sons of kings